Francisco Martin Duran (born September 8, 1968) is an American criminal who is mostly known for his actions of October 29, 1994, when he fired 29 rounds from an SKS rifle  at the White House. Duran was later convicted of attempting to assassinate United States president Bill Clinton and sentenced to 40 years in prison.

History 
Francisco Duran was born in the barrio Barelas of Albuquerque, New Mexico. The barrio is a poor, often crime-ridden neighborhood. Duran had six siblings, all born to different fathers, all moving in and out of his life. His mother was a cleaning lady and did the best she could for her children with food stamps and any government assistance she could get. Duran was the one closest to his mother and was always a quiet, reserved, child. He graduated without anyone really knowing him or leaving an impression. The only things notable about him were that he was in JROTC and had one minor brush with the law. He was arrested at 17 and charged with the 'attempted theft' of a front-end loader that he was going to take for a joy ride. The judge took pity on "Frankie," though, and made a deal with him that he'd drop the charges if he enlisted in the Army. Duran accepted the judge's deal quickly and willingly, and his mother gave her permission since he was a minor.

Military 
Joining the military would provide him with many opportunities such as further education, economic advancement, and a desired status in the community. After basic training, he succeeded in being selected as a medical specialist. His first tour of duty was with the 25th Light Infantry Division in Hawaii. He was an unremarkable soldier. It was during this tour that he fell in love and had a son and was married shortly after.

On August 9, 1990, Duran and a group of army buddies got drunk at a bowling alley and were asked to leave when an argument broke out between the soldiers and some civilians about the soldiers' boisterous behavior. Tempers only rose as the civilians blocked Duran when he tried to leave in his car. He confronted one of the civilians before getting back in his car, and managed to leave before turning back around and driving into the crowd that was still milling around. He hit and injured a woman before driving away. He was stopped and arrested by military police.

He was court-martialed and found guilty of drunken driving, aggravated assault, drunken and disorderly conduct and leaving the scene of an accident. He was stripped of rank and sentenced to five years in prison at the US Military Detention Center at Fort Leavenworth, Kansas He was released after two and a half years in 1993.

Attempted assassination of Bill Clinton 
On Saturday October 29, 1994, dressed in a trench coat, Duran approached the fence overlooking the north lawn of the White House and fired a 7.62×39mm SKS semi-automatic rifle (Chinese-made copy Type 56) at a group of men wearing dark business suits on the White House lawn. Two nearby boys claimed they had remarked aloud just before the shooting that one of the men looked like Clinton. Secret Service agents immediately began running across the lawn, with their guns drawn, when citizens Harry Rakosky, Ken Davis, and Robert Haines tackled Duran and pinned his arms until he could be subdued. Clinton was reportedly inside watching a football game at the time of the shooting and was not harmed. The incident followed just six weeks after Frank Eugene Corder crashed a Cessna into the White House south lawn and prompted debate about closing off traffic on that area of Pennsylvania Avenue. No one was injured in the assassination attempt.

Trial 
The most important charges in the two-week trial were attempted murder of the president and four counts of assaulting a federal officer (the Secret Service agents). Duran had served prison time previously, convicted of aggravated assault with a vehicle in the U.S. Army, and therefore, beyond the attempted murder of the President he was also charged with illegal possession of a firearm by a convicted felon. The other charges were use of an assault weapon during a crime of violence, destruction of U.S. property, and interstate transportation of a firearm with intent to commit a felony.

Duran pleaded not guilty and mounted an insanity defense, claiming that he was trying to save the world by destroying an alien "mist", connected by an umbilical cord to an alien in the Colorado mountains.  Prosecutors stated he was faking insanity and called more than 60 witnesses to testify that Duran hated government in general and President Clinton in particular.  The jury deliberated for under five hours to reject the insanity defense and arrive at the guilty verdict. He was sentenced to 40 years in prison by US District Court Judge Charles Robert Richey.

, Duran was serving his sentence at the medium-security Federal Correctional Institution at Florence Federal Correctional Complex in Florence, Colorado. , Duran was serving his sentence at the high-security United States Penitentiary, Lee. The Bureau of Prisons projects his release date to be 2029.

References

External links 
 November 19, 1994 Washington Post article
 March 23, 1995 Washington Post article
 Public Eye speculation on Duran's motivations

1968 births
1994 crimes in the United States
American failed assassins
American people convicted of assault
American people convicted of attempted murder
American prisoners and detainees
Attacks in the United States in 1994
Failed assassins of presidents of the United States
Living people
People from Albuquerque, New Mexico
Presidency of Bill Clinton
Prisoners and detainees of the United States federal government
Prisoners and detainees of the United States military
United States Army personnel who were court-martialed
White House intruders